Kunto August Karapää (born Gunnar August Wallin; 1913–1963) was a Finnish stage and film actor. He was married to actress Kirsti Hurme 1944–1950.

Selected filmography
 Substitute Wife (1936)
 Radio tekee murron (1951)

References

Bibliography 
 Pietari Kääpä. Directory of World Cinema: Finland. Intellect Books, 2012.

External links 
 

1913 births
1963 deaths
Finnish male film actors
People from Mäntsälä